Beijing Subdistrict is a subdistrict of Yuexiu District, Guangzhou, Guangdong province, China. , it has 13 residential communities under its administration.

References 

Administrative divisions of Yuexiu District